Christian Sokapie Essel (born 6 December 1989) is Liberian retired footballer who played as both a midfielder and striker.

Career 
Born in capital city of Monrovia, Essel began his career with Buduburam FC played here six years and joined than in Januar 2003 to Cameroonian club PWD Bamenda. After one year with the team joined in his native Ghana who played at Buduburam School for some clubs on the camp Kiawu SC, Roza FC, Shoes FC and then DISM. In summer 2007 was scouted from MTN Sports Academy Head Coach Ibrahim Sunday, for Zaytuna F.C. and joined than after the relegation to Sporting St. Mirren in Winter 2008/2009.

During summer 2011 he has been on trial with Serbian SuperLiga clubs FK Sloboda Point Sevojno and FK Radnički 1923. He eventuallyget contract with FK Radnički 1923 but failed to make a debut in the Serbian SuperLiga.

International 
He represented the Liberia national football team on his debut 6 June 2008 in Blida against Algeria national football team.

Honours 
Invincible Eleven
Liberian Cup: 2011

References

External links 
 

1989 births
Living people
Sportspeople from Monrovia
Liberian footballers
Liberia international footballers
Association football forwards
Association football midfielders
Expatriate footballers in Cameroon
Zaytuna F.C. players
Expatriate footballers in Ghana
Sporting Saint Mirren F.C. players
Expatriate footballers in Serbia
FK Radnički 1923 players
Expatriate footballers in Hungary
Expatriate footballers in Sweden